Mohd. Ali Khan  (born 1 January 1948 Birth Place Village Rudrur, District Nizamabad (Telangana)) is the politician from Indian National Congress Party. He was elected to Rajya Sabha from state of Andhra Pradesh of the ticket of INC since April 2008.

He is appointed as Whip for INC in Rajya Sabha.

He continue to represent Andhra Pradesh State in Rajya Sabha after its re-organization since 2 June 2014.

References

1948 births
Living people
Rajya Sabha members from Andhra Pradesh
Indian National Congress politicians from Andhra Pradesh
People from Nizamabad district